Barros is a Portuguese and Galician surname. It may refer to:

People
Alejandra Barros, Mexican actress
Alex Barros, Brazilian motorcycle road racer
Ana Beatriz Barros, Brazilian model
Ana P. Barros, American civil and environmental engineer
Antônio Carlos de Mariz e Barros, Brazilian navy officer
César Barros (fencer), Chilean fencer
Augusto Barros (1929-1998), Portuguese painter, also known as Barros, and Augusto Barros Ferreira
Dana Barros, United States basketball player
Diego Barros Arana, Chilean educator, diplomat, and historian
Flavio Barros, Brazilian footballer
Guillermo Barros Schelotto, Argentine footballer
Gustavo Barros Schelotto, Argentine footballer and twin brother of Guillermo
José Barros, Colombian musician
Juan José Barros, Peruvian footballer
Leila Barros, Brazilian volleyball player
Luis Barros Borgoño, Chilean politician
Luiz Cláudio Barros (born 1978), Brazilian footballer
Marisa Barros, Portuguese long-distance runner
Pía Barros (born 1956), Chilean writer
Ramón Barros Luco, President of Chile between 1910 and 1915
Rui Barros, Portuguese footballer
Zoila Barros, Cuban volleyball player
Lisa Barros D'Sa, British actress and director

Places
Barros, Asturias, parish within the town of Langreo, in the Spanish province of Asturias
 Orocovis, Puerto Rico, former name of the (now) town of Orocovis, Puerto Rico

Other uses
Barros Luco, sandwich named after Ramón Barros Luco.
Barros Jarpa, sandwich named after Ernesto Barros Jarpa.

See also
For people with the surname de Barros see De Barros

Portuguese-language surnames
Galician-language surnames